Michele Santoni (born 18 May 1980) is an Italian-Dutch football manager who manages FC Dordrecht.

Career

In 2008, Santoni was appointed youth manager of Dutch second division side Haarlem, where he said "in the Netherlands it is structure, structure, structure, structure".

In 2009, he was appointed video analyst of Ajax, the most successful club in the Netherlands.

In 2014, Santoni was appointed assistant of Italian Serie A outfit Livorno, where he said "in Italy there is much more improvisation, it goes by feel". After that, he was appointed youth manager of Lazio in the Italian Serie A, where he said "Lazio's facilities were a disaster. We only had one artificial grass pitch and no hot water. Politics also plays a major role there, as a result of which the youth academy is not 100 percent about talent development. Then that player had to be added because his father sponsors the club, then another player from a big agent came in, just to keep that agent happy. Typically Italian", before being appointed video analyst of Inter, one of Italy's most successful teams.

In 2018, Santoni was appointed manager of Almere City in the Dutch second division. After that, he was appointed assistant of Dutch side ADO Den Haag.

In 2021, he was appointed manager of FC Dordrecht in the Netherlands.

Personal life
Born in Arco, Trentino, Santoni is the son of an Italian father and a Dutch mother, and is fluent in Italian, Dutch and English.

References

External links
 

1980 births
Living people
Italian people of Dutch descent
Sportspeople from Trentino
Italian football managers
Almere City FC managers
FC Dordrecht managers
Eerste Divisie managers
Italian expatriate football managers
Italian expatriate sportspeople in the Netherlands
Expatriate football managers in the Netherlands